Big Brother 16 is the sixteenth season of the American reality television series Big Brother. The season premiered on June 25, 2014 with a two-night premiere with the following episode airing on June 26, 2014, broadcast on CBS in the United States and Slice in Canada, and ended with a 90-minute season finale on September 24, 2014, after 97 days of competition. Julie Chen returned as host. On September 24, 2014, Derrick Levasseur was crowned the winner defeating Cody Calafiore in a 7-2 jury vote. Donny Thompson was voted as the season's America's Favorite HouseGuest.

Format

The format has changed slightly from previous seasons. The contestants, who are referred to as "HouseGuests," are sequestered in the Big Brother House with no contact to or from the outside world. Each week, the HouseGuests take part in several compulsory challenges that determine who will win food, luxuries and power in the House. The winner of the weekly Head of Household (HoH) competition, who was formerly guaranteed safety, can now be overthrown due to a new competition called the "Battle of the Block." The two winners of the HoH competition each week will pick two nominees, who then go head-to-head in this competition. The winning team is guaranteed a week of safety and overthrows the HoH who nominated them. The HouseGuests nominated for eviction by the other HoH then become the official nominees for the week. The Battle of the Block twist was retired after Week 8, with only one HouseGuest being awarded HoH and two nominees at all times. The reigning HoH also earns the right to name the "Have-Nots" for the week, forcing the chosen HouseGuests to eat solely "Big Brother slop" along with a weekly food restriction (chosen by the viewing public), take cold showers and sleep on cold beds in a freezer-like bedroom.

Each week, six HouseGuests are selected to compete in the Power of Veto competition: the reigning HoH, their two nominees, and three HouseGuests selected by random draw. The winner of the POV competition wins the right to either revoke the nomination of one of the nominated HouseGuests or leave them as is; if the Veto winner uses this power, the HoH must immediately nominate another HouseGuest for eviction.

On eviction night, all HouseGuests except for the HoH (who is only allowed to vote in the event of a tie and must announce it in front of the other HouseGuests) and the nominees vote to evict one of the two nominees. This compulsory vote is conducted in the privacy of the Diary Room by the host Julie Chen. Unlike most other versions of Big Brother, the HouseGuests may discuss the nomination and eviction process openly and freely. The nominee with the greatest number of votes will be evicted from the House on the weekly live broadcast, exiting to an adjacent studio to be interviewed, after which the cycle begins again.

HouseGuests may voluntarily leave the House at any time and those who break the rules may be expelled from the house, with the most recent case in Big Brother 14. The last nine evicted HouseGuests will vote for the winner on the season finale. These "Jury Members" will be sequestered in a separate house and will not be allowed to watch the show except for competitions and ceremonies that include all of the remaining HouseGuests. The jury members will not be shown any Diary Room interviews or any footage that may include strategy or details regarding nominations.

HouseGuests

Future appearances
Caleb Reynolds made an appearance on Big Brother 17 to host the final Power of Veto competition. Nicole Franzel returned to Big Brother 18, then also hosted the first HoH competition on Big Brother 19. Nicole Franzel appeared on Big Brother 20 to celebrate her engagement to Victor Arroyo, along with Derrick Levasseur and other Big Brother alumni. Frankie Grande went on to become a housemate on Celebrity Big Brother 18 in the UK. Derrick Levasseur made an appearance on Big Brother 19 to host an HoH competition, and on Big Brother 20 to share his thoughts on the season. In 2020, both Nicole and Cody Calafiore returned to compete on Big Brother: All-Stars.

Outside Big Brother, Caleb Reynolds also competed on Survivor: Kaôh Rōng and Survivor: Game Changers. On July 31, 2018, three contestants from this season of Big Brother appeared on MTV's Fear Factor: Survivor vs. Big Brother episode. Calafiore and Zach Rance represented Big Brother 16, while Reynolds represented Survivor. Nicole Franzel competed on The Amazing Race 31 with her then-fiancé, Victor Arroyo. Amber Borzotra competed on the thirty-sixth season, thirty-seventh and thirty-eighth season of The Challenge.

Summary
Day 1, Julie introduced eight of the sixteen HouseGuests who moved into the house first. These were Paola, Donny, Cody, Frankie, Amber, Nicole, Devin and Joey. Upon entering the house, Paola and Devin made an eight-person alliance called "The Crazy 8's" against the others who would enter soon. Paola flirted with Cody to get him as an ally. Devin made a side alliance with Donny, calling themselves the "Double-Ds." The four girls formed an "El Cuatro" alliance after Amber and Paola were adamant about a female winning this season. Later, the eight HouseGuests competed in the first HoH competition: Go Fly a Kite. The goal was to balance on a rotating log while trying to keep a kite from crushing a sand castle. Frankie won and became the first HoH. Julie told the first eight HouseGuests that when the other eight arrived, another HoH would also reign and that neither HoH would be safe yet. Following this announcement, Julie informed the viewing public that three HouseGuests ("Team America") would be chosen by poll and given tasks by the American public. Upon the successful completion of each task, the Team America members would receive $5,000 apiece.

Later on Day 1, the remaining eight HouseGuests moved in. These were Victoria, Caleb, Brittany, Christine, Derrick, Zach, Jocasta and Hayden. Julie called everyone into the backyard for the second group's HoH competition: Over the Coals. The goal was to be the last one to hold on to a large rotating stiff. The girls quickly fell, with Zach and Derrick soon following. Caleb won and became the second HoH. Julie informed the HouseGuests of how the dual-HoH twist would work: Frankie and Caleb would make separate nominations, meaning a total of four nominees on the block. Following the nominations, those four would compete as duos in the Battle of the Block competition. The duo that won the competition would be removed from the block and immune from being named the replacement nominee if the veto was used that week, whereas the HoH who nominated them would be dethroned and eligible to be the replacement nominee; meaning that the outgoing HOH could go from being HOH to being evicted within a week for the first time ever.

After the HoH rooms were revealed, Caleb and Frankie strategized. They decided to form an all-guy alliance with Devin, Derrick, Cody and Zach called the "Bomb Squad." Elsewhere, Christine and Nicole hit it off and formed an alliance of their own. Wanting to balance out the all-male alliance and have the numbers on their side, Devin told Amber and Christine about the Bomb Squad and, without the alliance's supervision, made them members of the alliance, making his allies skeptical of his gameplay. They were also concerned with Devin's paranoia, after Devin suggested that Donny was an intimidating force to be reckoned with. Frankie thought it would be best to nominate the people who fell off first during the HoH competitions. Caleb and Frankie agreed to each nominate two people from the group they did not enter with to avoid bringing attention to themselves. During the nomination ceremony, Caleb made his nominations first: Donny and Paola. Despite having formed a bond with Victoria, Frankie nominated her along with Brittany for being the first two who fell during their HoH competition.

After the nomination ceremony, the four nominees participated in the first-ever "Battle of the Block" competition, called The Pouring 20s. The objective was for one person to swing and get water in a glass cup, then throw the water into another glass cup held by the other person; that person would swing backward to dump the water into a glass vase full of berries. The first duo to fill the vase and spill a berry would win immunity, come off the block and dethrone the HoH who nominated them. Following Brittany and Victoria's win, Caleb became the first official HoH of the summer while Donny and Paola were still on the chopping block. Fearing that the guys already made an all guy alliance, Joey decided to make an all girls alliance, which failed miserably. And unbelievably, she decided to tell everyone about the all girls alliance, including the members of the "Bomb Squad". On Day 7, the first veto competition of the season, Miami Lice, took place. Cody, Victoria and Zach were picked to play. Only Donny and Zach spelled valid words and Donny won the Power of Veto for spelling the longest word. After the veto competition, Caleb talked to Joey about the all girls alliance she tried to form, and Joey tried to apologize to Caleb about that and she hopes that she won't be the replacement nominee for eviction. At the veto meeting, Donny removed himself from the block and Caleb named Joey as the replacement nominee. On Day 14, Joey became the first HouseGuest to be evicted from the house by a unanimous 13–0 vote.

Following Joey's eviction, the HoH competition called BB Rager was played. The object was to walk across a balance beam and carry six kegs to the other side. Amber was crowned the first HoH with seven girls competing, and Cody was originally crowned the second HoH with seven guys competing. However, after a review of the tape, it was determined that Cody had stepped off the beam and was disqualified. Devin was subsequently crowned the second HoH. That night, Devin and Amber received their HoH room and read their letters. Seeing his daughter's picture, Devin felt bad about his gameplay and apologized to Donny. He then held a house meeting telling everyone how he had falsely accused Donny and had forced Caleb to nominate him. Brittany realized that what Caleb had said about nominating those who fell first was a lie and said so. During a Bomb Squad chat, Frankie and Caleb told Devin that what he said had "thrown Caleb under the bus." They also informed him about what Brittany had said, which made her his prime target. At the nomination ceremony, Devin nominated Paola and Brittany. Then Amber nominated Hayden and Nicole. Before the Battle of the Block, Devin secretly asked Paola to throw the competition, vowing she would be safe if he wins the power of veto. On Day 14, Hayden and Nicole competed against Paola and Brittany in the We Did What?! Battle of the Block competition. The nominees were asked a question, then shown a slideshow. Next they had to search for the answer in the slides. If a HouseGuest buzzed in with the correct answer, they scored a point for their team. After each round, the team who scored the point gave a distraction, such as beer goggles or a leaky beer helmet, to the other team. An incorrect answer resulted in the other team gaining a point, and their team receiving the distraction. The first team to four points won. Hayden and Nicole won the Battle of the Block, resulting in Amber being dethroned, Devin being the HoH for the week and Brittany and Paola remaining on the block. Later in the week, Caleb revealed to Devin that the members of the Bomb Squad were planning on keeping Brittany over Paola, which caused Devin to have another house meeting where Zach admitted to wanting Devin out of the house. At the veto competition, called Big Brother Galaxy, Zach, Derrick and Amber were chosen to compete, with Donny as the host. Devin won and Brittany pleaded for him to use the veto on her, noting their similarities as being single parents. At the veto meeting, Devin granted Brittany another week in the Big Brother house and used the POV on her, breaking the deal with Paola, and nominating Zach in her place. On Day 21, Paola was evicted from the house by a 10–2 vote, with only Donny and Jocasta voting for Zach.

Following Paola's eviction, HouseGuests played the HoH competition Underwater Polo, in which the goal was to knock a ball into the highest number slot, numbered 1–29, on the end of the field. Nicole and Derrick became the new HOHs with Nicole scoring a perfect 29 and Derrick scoring a 28. The main goal for the HouseGuests this week is to backdoor Devin. So Nicole nominated Amber and Donny for eviction, and Derrick selected Caleb and Jocasta. When the nomination ceremony was finished, it became clear to Devin that the HouseGuests want to backdoor him at the end of the week. Amber and Donny took on Caleb and Jocasta in the Abraca-BOB-ra Battle of the Block competition. In the competition, one HouseGuest ran across the yard to a bin containing puzzle pieces. Meanwhile, their partner was raised in the air next to their puzzle board. The first duo to complete their puzzle correctly and hit the button won the Battle of the Block, became immune from this week's eviction, made their HOH wear a frog costume for the rest of the week, and dethroned them. Donny and Amber prevailed, saved themselves for the week, made Nicole wear the frog costume and left Caleb and Jocasta on the block with Derrick as the sole HoH for the week. At the Tumblin' Dice POV competition, Donny, Devin and Christine were chosen to compete. Jocasta, feeling ill from the Battle of the Block competition, sat out of the POV. Donny won and used the veto on Jocasta. Devin was named as the replacement nominee. On Day 28, Devin was evicted by a unanimous 11–0 vote.

Following Devin's eviction, on Day 28, the HouseGuests were paired (Amber and Zach, Victoria and Christine, Caleb and Nicole, Cody and Frankie, Donny and Hayden and Brittany and Jocasta) for the Deviled Eggs HoH competition. The goal was for the duos to maneuver an egg through chicken wire while passing it back and forth between partners. The first pair to collect 12 eggs was the winner. After a close race, Cody and Frankie edged out Brittany and Jocasta to win Head of Household. After the HOH competition, it became clear to Derrick, Cody, Christine, Frankie, and Zach that the Bomb Squad is about to blow up, and with the tension between Caleb and Amber, they decided to start a new alliance called "The Detonators." The main goal for this week was to get Brittany evicted. On Day 29, Frankie nominated Amber and Jocasta and Cody nominated Brittany and Victoria for eviction. Before the BOTB, Amber talked to Christine about working with her and Nicole to get the guys out of the house, but little does Amber know is that Christine's true loyalty is the Detonators and then a few days later, Christine ratted Amber out about her plan and it was official that next week, they were going to backdoor Amber if one of the Detonators win HOH. The nominees then played in the Knight Moves Battle of the Block competition. All four women started in a different corner of a giant chess board. They then alternated moving like a knight in chess. When a space was landed on, the space was out of play and could not be landed on again. After Jocasta was eliminated, Amber beat Brittany and Victoria and won the Battle of the Block for her and Jocasta, took themselves off the block, guaranteed themselves safety for the week, dethroned Frankie, and left Brittany and Victoria on the block with Cody as the sole HoH for the week. On Day 30, Cody, Brittany and Victoria, along with Caleb, Nicole and Zach, competed in the BB Cup POV competition. Each round, every player controlled a robotic leg in order to kick a soccer ball into a sectioned, numbered soccer net. After everyone had kicked, the person with the lowest score was eliminated and claimed a prize. People eliminated in later rounds could either keep their prize or trade for an already revealed prize. In the end, Cody got penalty kicks to the butt, Brittany had to score 2,400 soccer goals in 24 hours, Caleb won $5,000, Zach claimed a Germany vacation, Nicole was forced to wear a Germitard for a week and Victoria won the POV. When Caleb took the $5,000 over the Veto, Cody seriously considered putting him up as a replacement nominee. But after Frankie told Derrick about this, he talked to Cody that it was a very bad game move and Derrick told Cody that his best option is to put up Donny as a pawn. On Day 33, Victoria used the Veto on herself and Cody named Donny as the replacement nominee. On Day 35, Brittany was evicted by a unanimous 10–0 vote.

Following Brittany's eviction, HouseGuests participated in the HoH competition called Country Hits, where each person faced one another in pairs; the winner of each face-off picked the next pair to compete, and the loser was eliminated. The last two HouseGuests standing would both become the HOH. The object was to determine whether the subject of each song was either a previous HoH, Battle of the Block or Power of Veto competition. Frankie became the first HoH after Derrick threw the competition out of respect for Frankie's grandfather passing away. After Zach and Christine (the last two HouseGuests standing) faced off against one another, Zach became the second HoH. On Day 36, Zach nominated Nicole and Christine for eviction, and Frankie nominated Jocasta and Victoria for eviction. Following the Nomination Ceremony, everyone went to the backyard for the Wedding Cake Take Battle of the Block competition, where Jocasta and Victoria and Nicole and Christine competed for safety. Nicole and Christine won the competition, dethroning Zach as Head of Household and left Jocasta and Victoria on the block with Frankie as the official HoH for the week. A few days before the veto, Hayden struck a deal with Victoria that if he wins the veto, then he'll use it on her. In the Sheriff Deputy Power of Veto competition, the HouseGuests had to rock their hips to make the horse they were seated on gallop. Once the horse galloped back and forth sixty times, they would dismount and have 30 seconds to stack gold bars on top of a giant inverted horseshoe. If the 30 seconds of allotted time ran out, they would be eliminated, but they could re-enter by agreeing to eat slop. Jocasta was the only player who ran out of time, but she took the slop and still lost. Hayden won the POV and, with a plan to backdoor Amber in motion, used the veto on Victoria and Frankie put Amber up against Jocasta. Just before the Veto meeting ended, Zach expressed his opinions on Amber; mostly on Caleb's crush on Amber such as him giving his blankets to Amber when she didn't get any from anyone else and him eating a pickle (the food that Caleb hates in the world) just to go on a date with her. But Amber didn't even say a word; thus making Team America fail their mission for this week. On Day 42, Amber was evicted by a unanimous 9–0 vote.

After Amber's eviction, the HouseGuests competed in the Getting Loopy competition. The HouseGuests saw clips of events that had occurred in the house. Julie asked questions based on those clips and they answered with either true or false. Anyone giving an incorrect answer was eliminated. Donny and Nicole became the new HoHs after a tie-breaker with Caleb, Derrick and Zach. Nicole planned on getting revenge for Amber's eviction by making a big game move by backdooring Frankie while Team America decided to carry out their missions without Donny. When talking to Donny, Caleb said he didn't want to be up next to Victoria. Zach tried to use reverse psychology on Nicole, but she nominated him alongside Jocasta. Donny nominated Caleb and Victoria. The nominated HouseGuests competed in the Domino Effect Battle of the Block competition. The objective was to build a trail of dominoes leading to a red buzzer and include three punishment dominoes of their choice which also had to be knocked down in order to win. If the last domino pushed the red buzzer, the winning duo would be safe and dethrone the HoH who nominated them. When Zach and Jocasta's falling dominoes did not hit the buzzer, Caleb and Victoria won, dethroning Donny from his HoH reign. In winning the competition, they chose to be on slop for the next two weeks, wear Adam and Eve costumes while being chained together for 48 hours and shave their hair (only Caleb had to shave). Christine, feeling like the third wheel between Nicole and Hayden, decided to tell Nicole a few fibs about Hayden which backfired, making Nicole not trust her anymore. Caleb, Victoria and Christine were picked to compete for veto. Each of the six played individually in BB Comics, a test where they "zip lined" past a comic studio wall to look at 16 new superhero comics based on the HouseGuests. The players then recreated the wall using a multitude of possible comic covers. The player who correctly arranged the comics in the shortest amount of time won the Veto. Everyone struggled with the multiple comics and the subtle differences between seemingly identical covers. Christine won the veto and, wanting to ensure that Zach would go home and not to rock the boat, decided to leave Nicole's nominations as they were, making Nicole's plan to backdoor Frankie blowing up in her face. The Hitmen and Caleb convinced the Detonators that Zach was a valuable "number", and they also told Frankie and Christine that if the veto was used, then Nicole was going to backdoor Frankie, leaving them surprised and in complete disbelief. So they decided to keep him and target Nicole and Hayden for future elimination. On Day 49, Jocasta was evicted by a 6–2 vote, with only Donny and Hayden voting for Zach, making her the first member of the Jury. The HouseGuests competed in the Mathcathlon HoH competition. Julie asked math questions based on events that took place in the house. The answer was either be more, less or exactly. A wrong answer meant elimination. In round 3, Caleb and Christine were the last remaining two. After the next round, Caleb was crowned the second HoH of the week. He nominated Hayden and Donny for eviction. Victoria, Zach and Christine were picked to play in the live veto competition. The HouseGuests competed in the Best of Duck Power of Veto competition. The HouseGuests raced down their lane to the ball pit to search for a rubber ducky, bringing back one at a time for a total of 3 and hitting the buzzer. Donny won the POV and took himself off the block. Caleb nominated Nicole in his place. In a blindside, Hayden was evicted by a 5–2 vote, with only Cody and Donny voting for Nicole, making him the second member of the Jury.

Following Jocasta and Hayden's eviction, it became clear to Frankie that he was losing support in the house. Nicole and Christine won the BB Tourn-eye-ment HOH competition. At the Nomination Ceremony, Nicole nominated Caleb and Frankie, with Frankie being her target. Caleb asked to be nominated so he could throw the Battle of the Block in an attempt to backdoor Frankie. Christine nominated Zach and Donny for eviction. At the Battle of the Block competition Moving the Chain, Caleb, saying he would not help Frankie, sat down along the sidelines, as he, along with Nicole, believed Frankie was responsible for Amber's eviction. In this competition, the duos had to work together ten times to maneuver a ball sitting on a ledge to roll into designated holes by moving chains. The winners got to go on a tailgating trip, the Dallas Cowboys Experience with the official HoH of the week. Zach and Donny started out well, but in the end, Frankie single-handedly won the BOB, with no help from Caleb, dethroning Nicole and making Christine the official HoH for the week all in one fell swoop, leaving Zach and Donny on the block, with Zach the new official target of the week. After Frankie fought against Zach, he decided to tell his secret about his famous sister, Ariana Grande to buy himself more time to mend the bridges that he broke. The veto competition, OTEV the Pissed-Off Penguin featured a waterfall and a giant penguin (voiced by Gilbert Gottfried). In a musical-chairs type set-up, participants had to retrieve drink cards named after the HouseGuest that the penguin called out. Zach won and took himself off the block. Rather than face the anger of the Detonators, Christine put up Nicole as a replacement nominee after Caleb, Cody, and Derrick told her that in another scenario, if Frankie won the veto, then Nicole was going to backdoor her. On Day 56, Nicole was evicted by a unanimous 6–0 vote, becoming the third member of the Jury.

Following Nicole's eviction, Derrick and Frankie won the next HoH competition, Dead of Household. With the Battle of the Block upcoming and the fact that the Bomb Squad members had decided to leave Victoria safe (as she remains the only HouseGuest who has yet to become HoH at least once), they needed three volunteers to go on the block. With nobody willing to volunteer, they drew Skittles out of a hat to determine the nominations. Christine was drawn to go on the block with Donny as Derrick's nominations, with Caleb and Cody going up as Frankie's. On Day 57, in the Battle of the Block competition, the players entered the Big Black Box and searched for five bones that were then placed in a scoreboard on the wall. Christine's plan to throw the competition, similar to Caleb's in a failed attempt to backdoor Frankie the previous week, failed when Donny located all five bones on his own, winning the competition and ensuring safety for the week for himself and Christine, dethroning Derrick, making Frankie the official HoH for the week and leaving Caleb and Cody on the block. Zingbot 3000 made a return and brought Kathy Griffin with him. That same day, Frankie won the POV in the Zingbot Reboot competition. Frankie used the Veto on Caleb in an attempt to mend fences with him after Amber's eviction. The Detonators' plan to backdoor Zach and bring "Team Zankie" to an end was put into motion after Frankie nominated Zach as Caleb's replacement. On Day 63, Zach was evicted by a unanimous 5–0 vote, becoming the fourth member of the Jury. Julie revealed to the HouseGuests that as of Week 9, there would no longer be a dual HoH and, accordingly, no Battle of the Block.

Following Zach's eviction, Nicole, Hayden, Jocasta and Zach, who was evicted moments earlier, returned to the house and competed in Comeback Fight, a competition where one of them would win the right to come back into the game. By a single disk, Nicole won and was given a second chance to win $500,000. The remaining eight HouseGuests competed in the Punching for Days HoH competition, where they had to identify the dates of various BB occurrences. After six rounds of competition, Cody was declared the first sole HoH of the season. On Day 64, Donny and Nicole were nominated for eviction. That same day, HouseGuests competed in the BBB Scorpion Power of Veto competition. HouseGuests were asked to guess how many of a certain item there were in a set and were rewarded with a security clearance ticket if they stayed rather than fold. The first HouseGuest to obtain three movie tickets was the winner, which was Cody. A plan was discussed to backdoor Frankie, but Derrick convinced Cody that it would be a poor game move to do so, so Cody chose to take Derrick's advice and decided not to use the POV. On Day 70, Donny was evicted in a unanimous 5–0 vote, becoming the fourth member of the Jury after Nicole returned to the game.

Following Donny's eviction, Caleb won his third HoH competition of the season in an ice-themed endurance competition, Sloppy the Snowman, while Derrick chose to go for a $5,000 cash option. Caleb decided to be in agreement with the house and focus on getting Nicole evicted. Therefore, he nominated Nicole and Christine for eviction. But Derrick had another target in mind, which is Christine. So Derrick told Nicole that she must win the veto, and they were going to vote Christine out. But if things go south, then they were going to backdoor Frankie. However, Christine won the POV in a memory competition called BB Blast, Inc. But the night before the veto meeting, Nicole compared Derrick to "Big Brother" legend Dan Gheesling, which made Derrick realize that backdooring Frankie isn't the best option and if Nicole stays and tells everyone about him and Dan Gheesling, then it's certain that Derrick is the next one out the Big Brother House. At the veto meeting, she removed herself from the block and Caleb selected Victoria as her replacement. In a 4–0 vote, Nicole was evicted for the second time and became the fifth jury member. Almost immediately, a Head of Household true-or-false competition was held which Derrick won with the only correct answer to the first question. He placed Christine and Victoria on the block, Frankie won the POV triple-maze competition, Mazed and Confused, did not use the veto, and Christine was evicted in a 3–0 vote, becoming the sixth juror.

Soon after Nicole and Christine's Eviction, Julie announced a new twist to the game, the Big Brother Rewind, a large button in the middle of the former have-not room. The HouseGuests argued about the pros and cons of pushing the button. Frankie won the following HOH competition called Seed Saw. In spite of only having guesses as to the consequences of pushing the rewind button, all the HouseGuests pushed it at the same time which started a countdown clock. In a surprise, Jeff Schroeder and Jordan Lloyd returned to the Big Brother house and Jeff proposed to Jordan with both their families present. After the festivities, Frankie nominated Cody and Victoria for eviction. The HouseGuests then competed in the BB Freakshow face morph POV competition, which Frankie won. He chose to keep the nominations the same. On Day 84, due to the pressing of the golden button, the eviction was cancelled and the Big Brother game rewound one week, right before the last HOH competition. All of the HouseGuests except Derrick (who was the outgoing HOH at the time) competed in the Seed Saw competition for a second time. This time, Caleb won HOH, and a plan to send Frankie home was put in motion by the other guys. After a 'luxury competition" where the Jury members destroyed the house in the "Jury Fury" competition, where the jury members had to find knock out pucks and momentarily returning juror Hayden and Victoria each won $5000, Caleb nominated Frankie and Victoria. In a redo of the BB Freakshow competition, Cody won the Power of Veto, and chose to keep the nominations the same. Frankie, in a last ditch effort to stay, threatened the other guys, claiming that if he were to go to jury he would be able to sway everyone's votes, however this fell on deaf ears and on Day 88, Frankie was evicted by a 2–0 vote and became the seventh member of the jury.

Shortly after Frankie's eviction, Derrick won the Foggy Memory "Before or After" HOH competition, securing himself a spot in the final three. He nominated Caleb and Victoria for eviction. Cody won the Power of Veto in the Stalking the Veto competition, sponsored by CBS' new show Stalker. On Day 90, Cody cast the sole vote to evict Caleb, making Caleb the eighth member of the jury.

Following Caleb's eviction, the final three competed in the first part of the final HOH competition, Fly High or Bye-Bye. The HouseGuests had to stand on a ledge while holding on to a hangglider. The last HouseGuest holding on to their glider will win Part One of the Final HOH and advance to Part Three. Cody hung on the longest and won. On Day 92, Derrick and Victoria competed in the second part of the final HOH, BBgypt. While competing individually, Derrick and Victoria had to scale the wall of a giant pyramid, searching for the names of the evicted HouseGuests. They then had to place the final nominees in each corresponding week. The HouseGuest who finishes faster will face off against Cody on finale night. Derrick was the winner. On Day 97, Cody and Derrick faced off in the part three of the final Head of Household, The Scales of Just-Us. They were asked questions based on how the jury members completed various statements. After 7 questions that ended in a 4–4 tie, Cody and Derrick answered a tiebreaker question to decide who would win part three, and therefore the final, HOH. Cody was closer to the correct number and became the final Head of Household. Cody evicted Victoria, making her the ninth member of the jury, and bringing Derrick to the final two. By a 7–2 vote, Derrick won the half million dollar prize, plus an additional $50,000 due to being a member of Team America. Donny, Nicole and Zach were the top three votegetters for America's Favorite HouseGuest but, in the end, Donny claimed the $25,000 with over 5 million out of the 10 million votes cast.

Episodes

Twists

Battle of the Block
In comparison to previous seasons of Big Brother which featured a single Head of Household, this season would involve two Heads of Household throughout part of the season. Each HoH would nominate two other HouseGuests for eviction, totaling four nominees. The two pairs of nominees would then compete in a new competition titled "Battle of the Block". The winning pair would be removed from the block, with the HoH who nominated them dethroned. The dethroned HoH would later be eligible to be nominated after the Power of Veto has been used, however the Battle of the Block winners are safe for the rest of the week. The rest of the cycle would continue as per usual, with the remaining HoH retaining immunity for the week, and the two nominees being eligible for safety through the Power of Veto.

Team America

Host Julie Chen introduced "Team America" during the first premiere show. This twist involved three HouseGuests, chosen by public vote, who would form a secret alliance in the house and work together to perform secret missions throughout the season. For every successfully completed mission, each member of the team would receive $5,000. Before the season began, fans were asked to vote for which HouseGuest they would want to form an alliance with, based on short biographies written by the HouseGuests themselves. The HouseGuests with the most votes would become the first member of "Team America," with the winners of this poll being revealed to the viewers on the second night premiere show. Team America was adapted from the "America's Player" twist from Big Brother 8 and Big Brother 10.

On the second night premiere show, Julie announced that Joey was voted by the viewers as the first member of Team America, and that the second member would be revealed on the first live show. On that live show, Joey was evicted and Donny was revealed as the new member of Team America. On the July 9, 2014 episode, it was announced that Derrick and Frankie would join Donny to complete the Team America trio. Throughout the season, the viewing audience was asked to vote between two tasks, one of which would be given to Team America.

It was later revealed that if a member of Team America won the game (in addition to the $500,000 prize), they would receive a bonus $50,000 in addition to their Team America winnings, which was achieved by member Derrick Levasseur, totalling his winnings to $575,000, which included the $5,000 in the Sloppy the Snowman competition where he opted for the 5,000 dollas and 5,000 hollas prize instead of winning the competition.

Task results
Joey was evicted before Team America's assembly was completed and thus received no tasks. Donny was evicted after seven tasks; he completed three, earning $15,000. Frankie completed four tasks, earning $20,000. Derrick completed five tasks (including the game winning bonus), earning $70,000.

Voting history

For the first eight weeks, two Heads of Household would be named each week. Each HoH names their set of Nominations. The two pairs of nominees would then compete in the "Battle of the Block" competition. The winning pair would win Immunity for the week (indicated by )
while the HoH who nominated them would be dethroned (indicated in strikethrough). The dethroned HoH would later be eligible to be nominated after the Power of Veto has been used.

Notes

: This Head of Household was dethroned after their nominees won the "Battle of the Block" competition. 
:  This player won immunity for winning the "Battle of the Block" competition.
: This was a Double Eviction Night. Following the first eviction, the remaining HouseGuests played a round of Big Brother, including HoH and Veto competitions, and nomination, veto and eviction ceremonies, during the live show, culminating in a second eviction for the night. Double Eviction Nights were played in the regular format, without a second HoH or Battle of the Block competition.
:  Jocasta, Hayden, Nicole, and Zach competed for an opportunity to come back into the game. Nicole won the competition and re-entered the house on Day 63.
: Following Christine's eviction, a golden buzzer appeared in the House. The golden buzzer was a "rewind button"; if the button were pressed, the week would continue as normal until the live eviction, but the eviction would be cancelled and events would be "rewound" to Day 77, just after Christine's eviction. The rewind button was activated on Day 83.
: As Head of Household, Cody chose to evict Victoria.
: During the finale, the Jury voted for the winner of Big Brother.

Production
Big Brother 16 was officially announced on September 12, 2013, a week before the finale of Big Brother 15. In March 2014, casting began with applicants being able to apply online or attend open casting calls throughout the country.

In June 2014, it was revealed that Big Brother 16 would be the first season of the series to be broadcast in 16:9 high definition. Plans to finally transition the show to HD were made as early as Big Brother 13, but were hampered by logistical challenges due to the nature of the program's format, such as the amount of video footage that would have to be stored and processed, and the need to install high definition cameras (which were also used to provide new shots and angles), wiring and post-production equipment. The house was also remodeled to benefit from the transition. Big Brother was the last primetime program across the five major networks to still be broadcast in 4:3 standard definition, and the second-last network program in any daypart behind fellow CBS series Let's Make a Deal (which had  migrated to HD for its new season that had started taping but would air later in the year).

Press interviews were filmed on June 17, 2014, the cast was announced on June 19, 2014 and the HouseGuests moved into the Big Brother house on June 20, 2014. Big Brother 16 began with a two-night premiere on June 25–26, 2014. On June 25, 2014, five days after the HouseGuests moved into the Big Brother house, eight of the 16 HouseGuests—Amber, Cody, Devin, Donny, Frankie, Joey, Nicole and Paola—were introduced, shown entering the house and taking part in the first HoH competition of the season, while on June 26, the eight HouseGuests who were not introduced the night before—Brittany, Caleb, Christine, Derrick, Hayden, Jocasta, Victoria and Zach—were introduced, shown entering the house and taking part in the second HoH competition. It was on the June 26 episode that the Team America and Battle of the Block twists were revealed.

Reception

Viewing figures

Controversy and criticism
Big Brother 16 was not known for season-long controversy, but mainly for certain minor events, including Frankie Grande for crass remarks targeting Victoria Rafaeli and Jocasta Odom. As well as Caleb Reynolds for his comments about President Obama, and his persistent treatment of Amber Borzotra.

References

External links
  – official American site
  – official Canadian site
 

2014 American television seasons
16